The NorthEast Secretariat on Human Rights (NESOHR) was established on July 9, 2004, in Kilinochchi as part of the 2002 Norway-facilitated peace process to improve human rights in the north east of Sri Lanka. NESOHR functioned in the Tamil areas until the end of 2008 when it was forced to end its operations. During its operations from Vanni, it released a large number of reports on the ongoing atrocities against Tamils. It was relaunched again in 2013 from outside Sri Lanka.

Joseph Pararajasingham, a member of the Sri Lankan Parliament, and A. Chandranehru, a former member of Sri Lankan Parliament, were founding members of NESOHR. Both were later assassinated, allegedly by para-military members.

Father M. X. Karunaratnam was Chairperson of the organization until his assassination on April 20, 2008. In a press release, NESOHR condemned, "in the strongest possible terms", "the Sri Lankan State" for his death.

NESOHR has been cited by the BBC and Amnesty International, as well as Sri Lankan newspapers.

In addition to reporting on human rights, NESOHR has also formed an informal partnership with the Association of Humanitarian Lawyers to discuss the application of international humanitarian law to Sri Lanka's armed conflict.

NESOHR has faced criticism for being too pro-LTTE. According to a U.S. diplomatic cable from November 2004, certain staffs of human rights organizations privately expressed reservations about NESOHR's credibility when it was established in July that year. Jo Becker of Human Rights Watch and Rory Mungoven, the UN's Senior Advisor on Human Rights in Sri Lanka, viewed the organization as lacking members with human rights and legal expertise. Becker also alleged that members of NESOHR downplayed the extent of child recruitment by the LTTE. However, critics also noted that the NESOHR had at least limited independence, and had the potential to become a more legitimate human rights organization.

See also
Human Rights in Sri Lanka

References

External links
 NESOHR official website

Imprisonment and detention
2004 establishments in Sri Lanka
Human rights organisations based in Sri Lanka
Organizations established in 2004